Mardochee Nzita (born 24 February 2000) is a football player who plays for Beerschot. Born in the DR Congo, he is a youth international for Belgium.

Club career
He was raised in the youth teams of Anderlecht and represented the club in the 2018–19 UEFA Youth League.

On 16 July 2019 he signed a contract with Italian Serie B club Perugia for a term of 3 years with an additional 1-year extension option.

He made his Serie B debut for Perugia on 21 September 2019 in a game against Spezia. He started the game and played the whole match.

On 5 October 2020 he joined Pescara on loan with an obligation to buy.

On 10 April 2022 Nzita signed a contract with Beerschot, effective from 1 July 2022 to June 2025.

References

External links
 

2000 births
Living people
Footballers from Kinshasa
Belgian footballers
Belgium youth international footballers
Democratic Republic of the Congo footballers
Belgian people of Democratic Republic of the Congo descent
Democratic Republic of the Congo emigrants to Belgium
Association football defenders
A.C. Perugia Calcio players
Delfino Pescara 1936 players
K. Beerschot V.A.C. players
Serie B players
Serie C players
Belgian expatriate footballers
Democratic Republic of the Congo expatriate footballers
Expatriate footballers in Italy